Maki’la depicts the rough life of street children in Kinshasa, the capital city of the Democratic Republic of Congo. It is notable as the directorial debut of Machérie Ekwa Bahango and for using the Congolese language Lingala on the silver screen. It premiered at the Berlinale 2018.

Plot
Nineteen-year-old Maki’la, nicknamed Maki, is member of a youth gang and married to their leader Mbingazor. Her husband treats his wife badly and likes to get high or drunk with his buddies. Maki’la has no friends apart from this gang until she gets to know the much younger girl Acha, who has just arrived in Kinhasa. Acha also has to live in the streets because she's an orphan. She clings to Maki’la looking for advice. Maki’la and Acha become a team and together they try break away from the gang.

Cast

Amour Lombi as Maki'la
Fideline Kwanza as Acha
Serge Kanyinda as Mbingazor
Deborah Tshisalu as Zola
Plotin Dianani as Champion
Ekwa Ekwa Wangi as Kele

Production 

While working on the set of Félicité in Kinhasa as a translator for director Alain Gomis Bahango decided to make her first own film.  On location she established a "special friendship" with some street children who told her  their lives. Therefore, she wanted her film debut  to "pay homage to them". She borrowed money from her family and hired mainly unexperienced young actors. Before they started filming they had rehearsals for several months. During the shooting in the streets of Kinhasa the inhabitants were very friendly and cooperative, openly encouraging the film crew. This showed especially during the market scenes, when the vendors helped the filmmaker by acting as unpaid extras and by convincing their customers to do the same. At a critical point Alain Modot of DIFFA (International Distribution of Films and Fiction from Africa) came across the movie poster on Facebook. He then watched the footage and was impressed. That led to a screening at the Orange Studio in Paris. This enabled Bahango to go on. All in all the production took Bahango three years.  During production Bahango found what she saw in the streets often "difficult for me to watch"  For the benefit of authenticity the director chose to have the camera at times being shaky, emulating the look of smartphone videos. She also had parts of Congolese songs mixed into the score.

Critical reception
Critics wrote positively about Bahango's directorial debut. The film was received as a film noir, a contribution to the gangster film genre  with a female protagonist.  It was also described as "a violent, tragic tale of survival" and  an "intimate portrait of poverty, femininity, and survival"."  The British Film Institute  called the film as "a 78-minute whirlwind" and as "an atmospheric drama" and praised its authenticity.

See also
Cinema of the Democratic Republic of the Congo
List of Democratic Republic of the Congo films
Cinema of Africa
Street children

References

External links
 
  Maki’la at UniFrance
 Maki'la at the Institut Français
 Maki’la at Africine

Lingala-language films
2018 drama films
2018 films